Fischbach is a village in the commune of Clervaux, in northern Luxembourg.  As of 2018, the village has a population of 112.

Fischbach is one of the municipalities of the Grand Duchy of Luxembourg.

It was part of the commune of Heinerscheid until its merger with Clervaux in 2009.

References 

Heinerscheid
Villages in Luxembourg